Richard Allen Bosman (born February 17, 1944) is an American former professional baseball pitcher. He played in Major League Baseball (MLB) for the Washington Senators / Texas Rangers (1966–73), Cleveland Indians (1973–75), and Oakland Athletics (1975–76). Bosman started the final game for the expansion Senators and the first game for the Texas Rangers. He is the only pitcher in Major League history to miss a perfect game due to his own fielding error.

Baseball career
Following that season, he was drafted from the Pirates by the San Francisco Giants, and then a year later was drafted again by the Senators. After another season in the minors, he made his major league debut on June 1, .

Bosman pitched for the Senators, and later the Rangers, for eight seasons. In 1969 he compiled a 14–5 mark and led the league in earned run average (2.19). He reached a career-high 16 victories in 1970, one of which was a one-hit, 1-0 shutout against Minnesota on August 14. César Tovar gave him the Twins only hit, a single.

Bosman was traded along with Ted Ford from the Rangers to the Indians for Steve Dunning on May 10, 1973. On July 19, 1974, Bosman no-hit the defending World Series Champion Oakland Athletics, a team that would go on to win the 1974 World Series to three-peat after winning the World Series in 1972 and 1973. He missed a rare perfect game due only to his own throwing error in the fourth inning, which gave the A's their lone baserunner in a 4-0 Indians victory.

The following season, Bosman would be traded to the very team he no-hit, as he was traded by the Indians along with Jim Perry to the A's in exchange for Blue Moon Odom. During the  season, Bosman won 11 games to help Oakland to a division title.

Bosman compiled 82 wins, 757 strikeouts, and a 3.67 earned run average. After retiring, he served as a pitching coach for the Chicago White Sox (1986–87), Rochester Red Wings (1988–91), Baltimore Orioles (1992–94), Texas Rangers (1995–2000), and was a coach in the Tampa Bay Rays' system since 2001. Known for teaching pitchers how to control the running game, he had a hand in developing James Shields, Wade Davis, Jake McGee, Jeremy Hellickson and Alex Cobb. Bosman retired after the conclusion of the 2018 season.

References

Sources
Robbins, Mike (2004). Ninety Feet from Fame: Close Calls with Baseball Immortality (New York: Carroll & Graf). 
Schneider, Russell (2005). The Cleveland Indians Encyclopedia, 3d ed. (Champaign, Ill.: Sports Publishing LLC).

External links

Cleveland Indians players
Oakland Athletics players
Chicago White Sox coaches
Texas Rangers coaches
Texas Rangers players
Washington Senators (1961–1971) players
Major League Baseball pitchers
American League ERA champions
1944 births
Living people
Baseball players from Wisconsin
Baltimore Orioles coaches
Hawaii Islanders players
Buffalo Bisons (minor league) players
Lexington Giants players
York White Roses players
Kingsport Pirates players
Major League Baseball pitching coaches
Sportspeople from the Chicago metropolitan area
Sportspeople from Kenosha, Wisconsin